Hrudayantar is an Indian Marathi-language drama film directed by Vikram Phadnis, produced by Young Berry Entertainment, Imtiaz Khatri, Purvesh Sarnaik and Vikram Phadnis Productions in association with TOABH Entertainment. The film stars Subodh Bhave and Mukta Barve in the lead roles.

This film also marks the directorial debut of Bollywood fashion designer Vikram Phadnis. It is the third collaboration of Barve and Bhave as previously they have worked together in the film Ek Daav Dhobi Pachhad and in the 2006 Marathi show Agnishikha. The film released on 7 July 2017. The film was Hrithik Roshan's debut Marathi film which he makes a guest appearance.

Plot
Hrudayantar is an emotional drama that explores the marital crisis of a couple Shekhar Joshi (Subodh Bhave) and Samaira Joshi (Mukta Barve) married for over 12 years. They have two beautiful daughters Nitya (Trushnika Shinde) and Nysha (Nishtha Vaidya) who have been the glue to their brittle marriage all these years. Shekhar, a hotelier is a workaholic. With hardly any time to spare for his family, he believes that he can either give his family a luxurious life or spend quality time with them.
Samaira on the other hand is also a working woman but being disciplined task master, manages her responsibilities towards her house, daughters and work with utmost skill. Her life mainly revolves around her daughters. Nitya, the elder between the two sisters loves to dance. Dancing is not only her passion but it means the world to her. Nysha on the contrary is an athlete in the making. Her love for outdoor sports makes her participate in every sport event at school. Hrudayanatar is the journey of the family and how through turbulent times the family learns and values relationships. Hrudayantar is about celebrating life.

Cast
Subodh Bhave as Shekhar Joshi
Mukta Barve as Samaira Joshi
Trushnika Shinde as Nitya Joshi
Nishtha Vaidya as Nysha Joshi
Meena Naik as Mrs. Deshmukh
Sonali Khare as Ashwini 
Ameet Khedekar as Dr. Gaurang
Meher Acharia Dar as Sister Jenny
Monika Dharankar as Dr. Tanvi Godbole
Atul Parchure as Mr. Aaglawe
Vishakha Subhedar Mrs. Aaglawe
Amol Bawdekar as Karthik
Sonia Mann as Sonia

Guest appearances 
Hrithik Roshan as Krishna Mehra aka Krrish / Himself
Shiamak Davar as himself
Manish Paul as himself

Production
The pre-production of the film started in November 2016. Mukta Barve and Subodh Bhave were cast as the leads. The film will be directed and produced by Vikram Phadnis under the banner of Vikram Phadnis Productions. This film is Phadnis' directorial debut in Marathi film industry. The film's cinematography will be by Dilshad V.A. The music direction of the film will be by Praful Karlekar and the lyrics will be penned by Mandar Cholkar.

Reception 
At the 2018 Filmfare Marathi Awards, the film received nomination in twelve categories: Best Film, Best Actor (Subodh Bhave), Best Actress (Mukta Barve), Best Director, Best Music (Praful Karlekar), Best Male Singer (Swapnil Bandodkar), Best Female Singer (Anandi Joshi), Best Costume, Best Art Direction, Best Debut Director, Best Story, and Best Screenplay; of which only Phadnis won the award in Best Costumes category.

References

External links
 

2017 films
2010s Marathi-language films
Indian drama films